was a junior college in Dazaifu, Fukuoka, Japan.

It was founded in 1989, moved administration to Kyushu Institute of Information Sciences in 1998, and closed in 1999.

Educational institutions established in 1989
Educational institutions disestablished in 1999
Japanese junior colleges
Buildings and structures in Dazaifu, Fukuoka
1989 establishments in Japan
1999 disestablishments in Japan